Oncideres immensa is a species of beetle in the family Cerambycidae. It was described by Martins and Galileo in 2009. It is known from Brazil.

References

immensa
Beetles described in 2009